Darnytsia is a widely found Ukrainian geographical name, which would most often stand for:

 Darnytsia, a historical and administrative neighbourhood of Ukraine's capital Kyiv
 Darnytsia, a river in Kyiv
 Darnytsia Railway Station, a large railway station in Kyiv.
 Darnytsia (Kyiv Metro), a metro station on the Sviatoshynsko-Brovarska Line of the Kyiv Metro.
 Darnytsia, a Kyiv metro-depot
 Darmytsia, a bus station
 Darnytsia Pharmaceutical Company CJSC, a major pharmaceutical company in Kyiv
 BG-116 Darnytsia, a ship of the Ukrainian Sea Guard,
- all named particularly after Kyiv's neighborhood.

 Darnytsia, a village in Hannivka community, Voznesensk Raion, Mykolaiv Oblast